More Brazil is a political party in formation, founded on 26 October 2022 by the fusion of Patriota and the Brazilian Labour Party (PTB). Both parties didn't reach the electoral threshold in the 2022 general election. Consequently, they would not have access to resources of the partisan budget nor the right of political propaganda in radio and television.

With the fusion, the valid votes of both parties are summed up and the new organization is considered as a party which reached the electoral threshold. The fusion awaits decision of the Superior Electoral Court.

History
Since the 2018 general election, a progressive electoral threshold was established for Brazilian political parties to have access to public partisan budget and propaganda in radio and television.

This year, Patriota didn't reach the minimum percentage. Consequently, the party merged with the Progressive Republican Party (PRP).

In 2022, both Patriota and PTB didn't reach the threshold. As a result, the parties began rounds of negotiation for a fusion.

On 24 October 2022, PTB Honour President, Roberto Jefferson, was arrested after disobeying measures of his home arrest imposed by the Supreme Federal Court. In the occasion, Jefferson shot at a Federal Police car.

On 26 October 2022, the fusion was approved by both parties national conventions, having as a requirement the ban on Jefferson and Eduardo Cunha in the new party. It was decided that the new party would be called More Brazil and will use the number 25, previously used by the defunct Democrats (DEM), which fused with the Social Liberal Party (PSL) in 2021 to form the Brazil Union.

Ideology
The parties in process of fusion to form More Brazil, PTB and Patriota, are conservative and nationalist parties, even having integralist factions with the arrival of some members of the PTB Brazilian Integralist Front.

The parties can be considered as right-wing to far-right, as some factions and ideologies are historically connected to the far-right.

References

2022 establishments in Brazil
Conservative parties in Brazil
Far-right political parties in Brazil
Nationalist parties in Brazil
Political parties established in 2022
Right-wing populism in South America
Right-wing populist parties